Fantasy Gardens may refer to:

Fantasy Gardens, an amusement park in Richmond, British Columbia, Canada, opened in the 1970s and torn down in 2010
Fantasy Gardens (Disney attraction), an attraction in Hong Kong Disneyland, Lantau Island, Hong Kong